Kia Sara (also Romanized as Kīā Sarā) is a village in Machian Rural District, Kelachay District, Rudsar County, Gilan Province, Iran. At the 2006 census, its population was 418, in 108 families.

References 

Populated places in Rudsar County